Toyo Rikagaku Kenkyusho, Ltd (東陽理化学研究所) is a Japanese company based in Tsubame-City, Niigata, whose core business is metalworking technologies.

External links
 Toyo Rikagaku Kenkyusho Official Website

Manufacturing companies of Japan
Companies based in Niigata Prefecture